Gene Lobe Field at Kitsap County Fairgrounds and Event Center is 1 of 4 ballparks at the Kitsap County Fairgrounds and Event Center. It has played host to the Kitsap BlueJackets of the West Coast League. The BlueJackets have not had a winning season since 2007.

On July 26, 2013, Spenser Watkins threw a perfect game against the Victoria HarbourCats in front of 413 fans cheering him on to a 2–0 win.

References

Sports venues in Washington (state)
Baseball venues in Washington (state)